Christian Scherer (56 years old in 2018) is a German-French Business executive. Born in Duisburg, Germany, and raised in Toulouse, France, he holds an MBA Degree in international marketing from the University of Ottawa and graduated from the Ecole Supérieure de Commerce de Paris.

He started his career in 1984 at Airbus where he was Head of Contracts, Leasing Markets and Deputy Head of Sales as well as Head of Strategy and Future Programmes. At Airbus Defence and Space, he headed Marketing & Sales. He was appointed CEO of ATR in October 2016. Schrerer returned to Airbus to replace Eric Schulz as Airbus' Chief Commercial Officer (CCO) on 13 September 2018.

References

Further reading
 

Living people
French chief executives
Airbus people
French aerospace engineers
École Polytechnique alumni
Supaéro alumni
People from Duisburg
Year of birth missing (living people)